James Hoyt may refer to:

James Hoyt (baseball) (born 1986), American baseball pitcher
James Hoyt (footballer) (born 1990), Fijian winger
James Hoyt (soldier) (1925–2008), American soldier, co-discoverer of the Buchenwald concentration camp
James Henry Hoyt (1809–1873), Connecticut state senator

See also
James Hoyte (fl. 1980s–2010s), Fijian footballer
James Holt (disambiguation)